The Tekapo River flows occasionally through the Mackenzie Basin, Canterbury, in New Zealand's South Island, although the riverbed is now often dry in the upper reaches. It maintains a constant flow below the confluence of several tributaries, notably the Maryburn, Forks, and Grays rivers.

The lower reaches (below the Maryburn confluence) are popular with anglers chasing brown and rainbow trout, although recent infestation by the invasive algae didymo (Didymosphenia geminata) has somewhat limited angling opportunities.

However, the water from Lake Tekapo is now diverted via a canal to Lake Pukaki as part of the Waitaki hydroelectric scheme. These lakes are used to store water, and occasionally during a particularly heavy snow melt or if the power stations or canal need servicing, water may spilt from either the dam or canal back into the riverbed.

These events are much anticipated by kayakers, to the extent that they have been known to re-shape parts of the riverbed to create "better" rapids.

In 2020, there were warnings of potential water spill. Normally, its summer maximum level is set at 709.8 meters above the sea level whereas it reached 709.9m at one point.

References

Rivers of Canterbury, New Zealand
Rivers of New Zealand